Witton Weavers Way is a waymarked long-distance footpath in Lancashire in England.

Length of the route 

Witton Weavers Way runs for 51 km (32 mi).

The route 

The route comprises a network of four circular trails and traditionally starts at Witton Country Park.

The route is designed to incorporate Weavers' cottages, Tudor period halls and country houses and in part follow Roman roads.

References

External links 
The Long Distance Walkers Association info
Blackburn with Darwen Borough Council comprehensive info on the walk

Long-distance footpaths in England
Footpaths in Lancashire
Transport in Blackburn with Darwen
Tourist attractions in Blackburn
Geography of Blackburn with Darwen